The 2010 Major League Baseball First-Year Player Draft was held on June 7–9, 2010 at the MLB Network Studios in Secaucus, New Jersey.

First-round selections
The draft order was determined based on the 2009 MLB standings, with the worst team picking first.

Key

Supplemental first-round selections
The "sandwich picks" after the first round are compensation for losses of free agents during the 2009–10 offseason.

Compensation picks

Other notable selections

Aaron Barrett, 9th round, 266th overall by the Washington Nationals
Brandon Cumpton, 9th round, 267th overall by the Pittsburgh Pirates
Whit Merrifield, 9th round, 269th overall by the Kansas City Royals
Zach Walters, 9th round, 271st overall by the Arizona Diamondbacks
Jacob deGrom, 9th round, 272nd overall by the New York Mets
Josh Spence, 9th round, 274th overall by the San Diego Padres
Yadiel Rivera, 9th round, 279th overall by the Milwaukee Brewers
Austin Brice, 9th round, 287th overall by the Florida Marlins
Tyler Lyons, 9th round, 289th overall by the St. Louis Cardinals
Tyler Holt, 10th round, 300th overall by the Cleveland Indians
Akeel Morris, 10th round, 302nd overall by the New York Mets
Mario Hollands, 10th round, 321st overall by the Philadelphia Phillies
Chi Chi Gonzalez, 11th round, 328th overall by the Baltimore Orioles
Eric Jokisch, 11th round, 340th overall by the Chicago Cubs
Chasen Shreve, 11th round, 344th overall by the Atlanta Braves
Adam Duvall, 11th round, 348th overall by the San Francisco Giants
Joc Pederson, 11th round, 352nd overall by the Los Angeles Dodgers
Robbie Ray, 12th round, 356th overall by the Washington Nationals
Stefen Romero, 12th round, 372nd overall by the Seattle Mariners
Kyle Ryan, 12th round, 373rd overall by the Detroit Tigers
Danny Burawa, 12th round, 385th overall by the New York Yankees
A. J. Griffin, 13th round, 395th overall by the Oakland Athletics
Tommy Medica, 14th round, 424th overall by the San Diego Padres
Nick Tepesch, 14th round, 436th overall by the Texas Rangers
Mike Bolsinger, 15th round, 451st overall by the Arizona Diamondbacks
Steve Wilkerson, 15th round, 473rd overall by the Boston Red Sox, but did not sign
Chase Whitley, 15th round, 475th overall by the New York Yankees
Cody Allen, 16th round, 480th overall by the Cleveland Indians
Dalton Pompey, 16th round, 486th overall by the Toronto Blue Jays
Cody Anderson, 17th round, 521st overall by the Tampa Bay Rays
Jason Garcia, 17th round, 533rd overall by the Boston Red Sox
Preston Claiborne, 17th round, 535th overall by the New York Yankees
Kris Bryant, 18th round, 546th overall by the Toronto Blue Jays, but did not sign.
Adam Eaton, 19th round, 571st overall by the Arizona Diamondbacks
Burch Smith, 20th round, 600th overall by the Cleveland Indians
C. J. Riefenhauser, 20th round, 611th overall by the Tampa Bay Rays
Cody Martin, 20th round, 615th overall by the Minnesota Twins
Brett Bochy, 20th round, 618th overall by the San Francisco Giants
Scott Copeland, 21st round, 628th overall by the Baltimore Orioles
Josh Smith, 21st round, 637th overall by the Cincinnati Reds
Kevin Shackelford, 21st round, 639th overall by the Milwaukee Brewers
Adam Liberatore, 21st round, 641st overall by the Tampa Bay Rays
Noel Cuevas, 21st round, 652nd overall by the Los Angeles Dodgers
Ben Rowen, 22nd round, 676th overall by the Texas Rangers
Evan Gattis, 23rd round, 704th overall by the Atlanta Braves
Blake Treinen, 23rd round, 707th overall by the Florida Marlins, but did not sign
Andrew Triggs, 24th round, 720th overall by the Cleveland Indians, but did not sign
Erik Goeddel, 24th round, 722nd overall by the New York Mets
Rocky Gale, 24th round, 724th overall by the San Diego Padres
Christian Bergman, 24th round, 740th overall by the Colorado Rockies
Casey Sadler, 25th round, 747th overall by the Pittsburgh Pirates
Ken Roberts, 25th round, 770th overall by the Colorado Rockies
A. J. Schugel, 25th round, 774th overall by the Los Angeles Angels of Anaheim
Ben Lively, 26th round, 780th overall by the Cleveland Indians, but did not sign
Danny Muno, 26th round, 790th overall by the Chicago Cubs
Scott Schebler, 26th round, 790th overall by the Los Angeles Dodgers
Alex Claudio, 27th round, 826th overall by the Texas Rangers
Brandon Cunniff, 27rd round, 827th overall by the Florida Marlins
Marco Gonzales, 29th round, 890th overall by the Colorado Rockies, but did not sign
Red Patterson, 29th round, 892nd overall by the Los Angeles Dodgers
Taylor Hill, 30th round, 900th overall by the Cleveland Indians
Josh Edgin, 30th round, 902nd overall by the New York Mets
Shawn Tolleson, 30th round, 922nd overall by the Los Angeles Dodgers
David Goforth, 31st round, 931st overall by the Cleveland Indians
Aaron Judge, 31st round, 935th overall by the Oakland Athletics, but did not sign
Kevin Kiermaier, 31st round, 941st overall by the Tampa Bay Rays
Jason Rogers, 32nd round, 969th overall by the Milwaukee Brewers
Matt Stites, 33rd round, 1000th overall by the Chicago Cubs
Tyler Wilson, 35th round, 1057th overall by the Cincinnati Reds
J. T. Riddle, 35th round, 1073rd overall by the Boston Red Sox, but did not sign
Brock Stewart, 40th round, 1202nd overall by the New York Mets, but did not sign
Dallas Beeler, 41st round, 1240th overall by the Chicago Cubs
Chris Rearick, 41st round, 1241st overall by the Tampa Bay Rays
Seth Maness, 41st round, 1247th overall by the Florida Marlins
Matt Tracy, 43rd round, 1307th overall by the Florida Marlins
A. J. Achter, 46th round, 1395th overall by the Minnesota Twins

NFL players drafted
Russell Wilson, 4th round, 140th overall by the Colorado Rockies
Blake Bell, 43rd round, 1303rd overall by the Detroit Tigers, but did not sign
Golden Tate, 50th round, 1518th overall by the San Francisco Giants, but did not sign.

References

External links

Top 50 Prospects for 2010 Draft at Draft America
MLB Agents for Top 50 Players Selected at SportsAgentBlog.com
2010 Major League Baseball draft at ESPN

[[[Category:Major League Baseball draft]]
Draft
Major League Baseball draft
Major League Baseball draft
Baseball in New Jersey
Events in New Jersey
Sports in Hudson County, New Jersey
Secaucus, New Jersey